The Arizona State Sun Devils men's ice hockey team is the college ice hockey team that represents Arizona State University. It plays its home games at Mullett Arena in Tempe.

The Sun Devils initially competed in the American Collegiate Hockey Association (ACHA). Since the 2015–16 season, it has competed as an independent in NCAA Division I—one of six active independent programs. Arizona State also maintains both WCHL Club Level teams with the WCHL D-1 Sun Devils, and the PAC-8 D-2 Sun Devils, respectively.

History 
Hockey began as a sport at Arizona State in the fall of 1983 with ASU students gathering at Tower Ice Plaza in Central Phoenix to play pick up hockey amongst each other. As collegiate club hockey evolved throughout the country, so did hockey at Arizona State.  By the late 80s ASU was fielding a full-fledged ice hockey team competing in Division II of the American Collegiate Hockey Association. In 1993, General Manager Mike Hoffarth led the program to achieving ACHA Division I status propelling the Sun Devil hockey program into the national spotlight by qualifying for the ACHA Division I National Tournament just two years later in the 1995–96 season. Then Head Coach, Gene Hammett would lead the program to three straight National Tournament appearances from 1995 to 1998.

ASU qualified for 10 ACHA Division I National Tournaments since competing at the Division I level in the American Collegiate Hockey Association, and developed 12 ACHA Division I All-Americans. In the 2013–14 season, the team won its first ACHA National Championship, defeating Robert Morris University-Illinois.

On November 18, 2014, Arizona State athletic director Ray Anderson announced that the Sun Devils would move to NCAA Division I ice hockey. The transition was funded by a  $32 million donation by multiple parties (including former ASU hockey players). As a transitionary season, the Sun Devils played a split schedule between ACHA and NCAA games during the 2015–16 season, before migrating exclusively to NCAA play the following season. The Sun Devils were expected to begin as an independent, but pursue conference membership in the future.

In the 2018–19 season, Arizona State received an at-large bid to the NCAA tournament for the first time in school history, in only its third season as a Division I team. They were defeated by the Quinnipiac Bobcats in the regional semifinals.

On October 6, 2020, the Sun Devils announced that for logistical reasons related to the COVID-19 pandemic, it would enter into an agreement to play all of its games as non-conference away games against Big Ten opponents, playing each of its seven hockey members four times in a 28-game season. This would assure the team a full season schedule, and avoid conflicts with the Coyotes at Gila River Arena due to the delay of the 2020-21 NHL season. The team still played as an independent, and were not eligible to qualify for the conference tournament.

Player Hall of Fame Inductees

Steve Hammett, Forward 1994–1998: Inducted 2009

Greg Powers, Goaltender 1995–1999: Inducted 2009

Adam Blossey, Defense 2001–2005: Inducted 2009

Tony Bonacorso, Defense 2004–2008, Inducted 2010

Ian Smith, Forward 1999–2003, Inducted 2010

Executive Hall of Fame Inductees

Gene Hammett, Head Coach 1992–2000: Inducted 2008

Mike Hoffarth, General Manager 1988–1999: Inducted 2008

Don Mullet, Donor: Inducted 2008

John Wold, Head Coach, General Manager, Oversight Committee 2001–present: Inducted 2009

Wayne Reid, Assistant Coach, Director of Hockey Ops, Oversight Committee 1992–present: Inducted 2009

Doug Maire, Video Coach, Projects Manager Executive Hall of Fame Inducted 2013, Lifetime Service Award 2014

National Tournament Appearances

1995–96, 1996–97, 1997–98*, 2000–01*, 2003–2004, 2006–07, 2009–10, 2010–11, 2011–12, 2012–15

Final Four appearances: 2013, 2014, 2015

Awards and honors

NCAA

All-Americans
AHCA Second Team All-Americans

2018–19: Joey Daccord, G

ACHA Division I All-Americans

Steve Hammett, Forward: 1997–98

Greg Powers, Goaltender: 1996–97, 1997–98, 1998–99

Ian Smith, Forward: 2000–01, 2001–02 (Team USA, World University Games 2002)

Nils Satterstom, Forward: 2000–01

Adam Blossey, Defense: 2003–04, 2004–05 (Team USA, World University Games 2005)

Tony Bonacorso, Defense: 2006–07, 2007–08 (Team USA, World University Games 2008)

Joe Schweiger, Forward: 2008–09 (Eastern Michigan), 2009–10, 2010–11

Mark Schacker, Goaltender: 2010–11, 2011–12

Kale Dolinski, Forward: 2012–13

Colin Hekle, Forward: 2012–13

Ryan Clark, Defense: 2012–13

Joe D’Elia, Goaltender: 2012–13

Arena
Prior to 2022, the Sun Devils played most of their home games at the Oceanside Ice Arena in Tempe. Selected games each season were played at Glendale's Gila River Arena, former home of the NHL's Arizona Coyotes. With the move to NCAA Division I, Anderson stated they planned to pursue an on-campus arena in the future. In the meantime, Oceanside underwent a renovation for the 2015 to bring its facilities to NCAA standards.

In November 2020, the Arizona Board of Regents' finance committee approved plans to construct a new 5,000-seat indoor arena on-campus near Desert Financial Arena, which is expected to house the school's hockey, gymnastics, and wrestling programs among others. Construction is slated to finish in the fall, and the Sun Devils will begin play there effective for the 2022–23 season and onwards.

Season-by-season results

All-time coaching records
As of March 12, 2023

Team

Current roster
As of July 18, 2022.

|}

Coaches

Head coach
Coach Powers has been on the Sun Devil Coaching Staff for 12 years, and enters his fifth year as Head Coach of ASU's NCAA Division 1 Hockey Program.  Coach Powers was a finalist for the 2019 Spencer Penrose Award, which is awarded to the NCAA Division 1 Coach Of The Year.

Prior to becoming an NCAA Division 1 hockey team, Coach Powers helped guide the Sun Devils to their first ACHA Division 1 National Championship.

During the 2018-2019 hockey season, Coach Powers and his staff led the Sun Devils to become the fastest start-up program to qualify for the NCAA Division 1 Tournament in NCAA History.   The Sun Devils finished the season ranked 10th in the Pairwise rankings.

Coach Powers was a three time ACHA Division 1 All-American Goaltender while playing hockey for the Sun Devils, and graduated from ASU's Walter Cronkite School of Journalism in 1999.  Powers was also inducted into the ASU Hockey Player Hall Of Fame in 2009.

Assistants and staff
 Alex Hicks - Assistant Coach  (former 15-year professional career including 5 years in the NHL with the Anaheim Mighty Ducks, Pittsburgh Penguins, San Jose Sharks, and the Florida Panthers)
 Mike Field - Associate Head Coach  (former Assistant Coach Division I and United States Hockey League)
 Eddie Lack - Volunteer Coach  (former 9-year professional career including 5 years in the NHL with the Vancouver Canucks, Carolina Hurricanes, Calgary Flames, and the New Jersey Devils).
 Andrew Matheson - Director of Hockey Operations
 Jon Laughner - Coordinator, Equipment Operations
 Liane Blyn - Head Coach, Olympic Sports
 Rick Covard - Assistant Athletic Trainer
 Chase Drieberg - Equipment Student Manager

Statistical leaders

Career points leaders

Career goaltending leaders

GP = Games played; Min = Minutes played; W = Wins; L = Losses; T = Ties; GA = Goals against; SO = Shutouts; SV% = Save percentage; GAA = Goals against average

minimum 30 games played

Statistics current through the start of the 2022–23 season.

Sun Devils in the NHL
As of July 1, 2022

References

External links

 
Ice hockey teams in Arizona
2015 establishments in Arizona
Ice hockey clubs established in 2015